Margaret Jean Anderson (August 7, 1915 – December 8, 2003) was a Canadian businesswoman and senator.

Born in Burnt Church, New Brunswick, she was president of the family business, W.S. Anderson and Company Ltd., a lumber company.

From 1972 to 1976, she was president of the New Brunswick Women's Liberal Association.

In 1978, she was summoned to the senate on the advice of Pierre Trudeau representing the senatorial division of Northumberland--Miramichi, New Brunswick. She sat as a member of the Liberal Party of Canada and retired at the age of 75 in 1990.

Anderson was also a member of the Miramichi Historical Society, past president of the UCW, former member of the Newcastle Curling Club and member of the St. James & St. John's United Church.

Anderson died in Miramichi, New Brunswick on December 8, 2003

References

 Debates of the Senate, Volume 141, Issue 7

External links
 

1915 births
2003 deaths
Canadian senators from New Brunswick
Liberal Party of Canada senators
Women members of the Senate of Canada
Women in New Brunswick politics
Businesspeople from New Brunswick
Canadian women chief executives
People from Northumberland County, New Brunswick
20th-century Canadian women politicians